Saṃhitā literally means "put together, joined, union", a "collection", and "a methodically, rule-based combination of text or verses". Saṃhitā also refers to the most ancient layer of text in the Vedas, consisting of mantras, hymns, prayers, litanies and benedictions.

Parts of Vedic Samhitas constitute the oldest living part of Hindu tradition.

Etymology
Saṃhita is a Sanskrit word from the prefix sam (सम्), 'together', and hita (हित), the past participle of the verbal root dhā (धा) 'put'. The combination word thus means "put together, joined, compose, arrangement, place together, union", something that agrees or conforms to a principle such as dharma or in accordance with justice, and "connected with". Saṃhitā (संहिता) in the feminine form of the past participle, is used as a noun meaning "conjunction, connection, union", "combination of letters according to euphonic rules", or "any methodically arranged collection of texts or verses".

Discussion
In the most generic context, a Samhita may refer to any methodical collection of text or verses: Any shastra, sutra, or Sanskrit Epic, along with Vedic texts, might be referred to as a Samhita.

Samhita, however, in contemporary literature typically implies the earliest, archaic part of the Vedas. These contain mantras – sacred sounds with or without literal meaning, as well as panegyrics, prayers, litanies and benedictions petitioning nature or Vedic deities. Vedic Samhita refer to mathematically precise metrical archaic text of each of the Vedas (Rigveda, Yajurveda, Samaveda and Atharvaveda).

The Vedas have been divided into four styles of texts – the Samhitas (mantras and benedictions), the Brahmanas (text on rituals, ceremonies, sacrifices and symbolic-sacrifices), the Aranyakas (commentaries on rituals, ceremonies and sacrifices), and the Upanishads (text discussing meditation, philosophy and spiritual knowledge). The Samhitas are sometimes identified as karma-khanda (कर्म खण्ड, action / ritual-related section), while the Upanishads are identified as jnana-khanda (ज्ञान खण्ड, knowledge / spirituality-related section). The Aranyakas and Brahmanas are variously classified, sometimes as the ceremonial karma-khanda, other times (or parts of them) as the jnana-khanda.

The Vedic Samhitas were chanted during ceremonies and rituals, and parts of it remain the oldest living part of Hindu tradition.

A collective study of Vedas and later text suggests that the compendium of Samhitas and associated Vedic texts were far larger than currently available. However, most have been lost at some point or over a period of Indian history.

Examples

Rig veda
The Gayatri mantra is among the famous Hindu mantras. It is found in Rig Veda Samhita.
:ॐ भूर्भुवस्वः। तत्सवितुर्वरेण्यम्। भर्गो देवस्य धीमहि। धियो यो नः प्रचोदयात्

– Rig Veda 3.62.10

Sama veda
Weber noted that the Samhita of Samaveda is an anthology taken from the Rigveda-Samhita. The difference is in the refinement and application of arts such as melody, meters of music, and literary composition. Thus, the root hymn that later became the Rathantara (Excellent Chariot) mantra chant is found in both Rigveda and Samaveda Samhitas, as follows,

Rigveda form:
Abhi tva sura nonumo 'dugdha iva dhenavah | isanam asya jagatah svardrsam isanam indra tasthusah

Samaveda form:
obhitvasuranonumova | adugdha iva dhenava isanamasya jagatassuvardrsam | isanama indra | ta sthu sa o va ha u va | as ||

Translation (same for both):
We cry out for you, hero, like unmilked cows to the lord of the living world !
To the lord of the unmoving world whose eye is the sun, O Indra !

Yajur veda

The Yajur Veda consists of:

1. Āpastamba-mantra-pāṭhá (Kr̥ṣṇa-yajur-vedá)

2. Kāṭha-saṁhitā́ (Kr̥ṣṇa-yajur-vedá)

3. Kapiṣṭhala-kāṭha-saṁhitā́ (Kr̥ṣṇa-yajur-vedá)

4. Māitrāyaṇa-saṁhitā́ (Kr̥ṣṇa-yajur-vedá)

5. Tāittirīya-saṁhitā́ (Kr̥ṣṇa-yajur-vedá)

6. Vājasaneya-saṁhitā́ (Şukla-yajur-vedá) with (Kāṇvá and Mā́dhyaṁdina as sub-divisions)

Of these six, the Tāittirīya and the Vājasaneya saṁhitā́-s are the most extant ones. The Āpastamba-mantra-pāṭhá consists of mantras only found in the Āpastamba Kalpa sūtrá literature of the Kr̥ṣṇa-yajur-vedá.

The hymns in Section 4.1.5 of the Yajurveda Samhita, dedicated to several ancient deities, state:

Atharva veda
A hymn in the Atharva Veda Samhita, for example, is a woman's petition to deity Agni, to attract suitors and a good husband.

Post-Vedic Samhitas
There are many well known books written in the post-vedic period, also known as samhitas, because the word “samhita” also means “systematic compilation of knowledge”. Vedic samhitas should not be confused with these samhitas of post-vedic period.

Some post-vedic Samhitas are –
Ashtavakra Gita
Bhrigu Samhita
Charaka Samhita
Deva Samhita
Garga Samhita
Gheranda Samhita
Kashyap Samhita
Shiva Samhita
Brihat Samhita
Sushruta Samhita (a treatise on food and medicine)
Yogayajnavalkya Samhita.

See also
Aranyaka
Brahmana
Upanishad
Veda

References

External links
 online edition in Sanskrit and English 
Rigveda Samhita First Mandala, (in Sanskrit)
Atharva-Veda Samhita English translation of first 8 books of the Atharva Veda Samhita, (Editor: Charles Rockwell Lanman), Wikisource
Understanding of the Hinduism: Hindu Scripture VI, Just for Kids
Rigveda Samhita Rigveda Samhita 5 Volumes in Hindi 

Hindu texts
Sanskrit words and phrases